ReverbNation.com is a website, launched in 2006, that focuses on the independent music industry. It aims to provide a central site for musicians, producers, and venues to collaborate and communicate. ReverbNation was bought for an undisclosed sum by music creation platform, BandLab, in November 2021.

Innovations
 ReverbNation provides a widget that allows its members to place content on web pages. This TuneWidget is a feature that links back to additional content, such as music recommended by the band who created the widget. In 2007, Webs (formerly Freewebs) added a widget service that included TuneWidget as an option for its web site users.
 A feature called Band Equity measures popularity based on four metrics of its service: reach, influence, access, and recency with the top 100 of each genre being recognized.

Events
 The band Rehab headlined the ReverbNation summer 2007 tour.
 In May 2008, Judas Priest pre-released a track from its upcoming album on ReverbNation. Its label, Epic Records, described the use of the TuneWidget as "a must have tool for any artist's viral campaign".
 In Dec 2009, ReverbNation partnered with Microsoft launching Playlist 7 sponsorship program where 7 top emerging artists were able to showcase their work having one of their songs featured.
 In Nov 2021, ReverbNation was acquired by BandLab.

References

Internet properties established in 2006
2006 establishments in the United States
2021 mergers and acquisitions
Digital audio distributors
American music websites
Social networking services